Pilane is a village in Kgatleng District of Botswana. It is located 10 km south-west of the district capital, Mochudi. The population was 1,178 in 2001 census.

References

Kgatleng District
Villages in Botswana
Populated places in Botswana